Zang Jialiang (born January 12, 1988, in Harbin, Heilongjiang) is a Chinese curler who trains in Harbin.

He made his world championship debut at the 2008 Grand Forks World Championships. Team China achieved their best result to date. In the round robin portion they achieved upset wins over Team Canada and Team Norway. They would finish in third after the round robin and for the first time a men's team from the Pacific region would qualify for the Playoffs. In the 3 vs. 4 Playoff match, they lost to Team Norway, and again in the Bronze Medal Match.

Team China was less successful at the 2009 Moncton World Championships, where it placed ninth overall.

Zang Jialiang represented Team China at the 2010 Winter Olympics in Vancouver, British Columbia, Canada.

Teammates
2010 Vancouver Olympic Games
Wang Fengchun, Skip
Liu Rui, Third
Xu Xiaoming, Second
Li Hongchen, Alternate

References

External links

1988 births
Living people
Chinese male curlers
Curlers at the 2010 Winter Olympics
Curlers at the 2014 Winter Olympics
Olympic curlers of China
Sportspeople from Harbin
Asian Games medalists in curling
Curlers at the 2007 Asian Winter Games
Curlers at the 2017 Asian Winter Games
Medalists at the 2007 Asian Winter Games
Medalists at the 2017 Asian Winter Games
Asian Games gold medalists for China
Asian Games bronze medalists for China
Universiade medalists in curling
Pacific-Asian curling champions
Universiade bronze medalists for China
Competitors at the 2009 Winter Universiade